The Cobra (also known as Cobra and Female Cobra) is a 1967 Italian-Spanish crime film directed by Mario Sequi.

Plot 
US intelligence comes in action to discover powerful organization in drug trafficking active  in the Mediterranean.

Cast 
 Dana Andrews: Capt. Kelly
 Peter Martell: Mike Rand 
 Elisa Montés: Corinne 
 Anita Ekberg: Lou 
 Jesús Puente: Stiarkos 
 Peter Dane: Hullinger 
 Luciana Vincenzi: Ulla 
 George Eastman: Crane 
 Omar Zolficar: Sadek 
 Giovanni Petrucci: King  
 Guido Lollobrigida: Killer 
 Conrado San Martín

References

External links

1967 films
Italian crime films
Spanish crime films
1967 crime films
Films set in Lebanon
Films set in Istanbul
Films about the illegal drug trade
Films scored by Antón García Abril
Films directed by Mario Sequi
1960s Italian films